Novokormikha is a rural locality (a selo) and the administrative center of Novokormikhinsky Selsoviet of Volchikhinsky District, Altai Krai, Russia. The population was 434 as of 2016. It was founded in 1810. There are 7 streets.

Geography 
Novokormikha is located 31 km northwest of Volchikha (the district's administrative centre) by road. Komintern is the nearest rural locality.

References 

Rural localities in Volchikhinsky District